Mehmandar-e Olya (also Romanized as Mehmāndār-e ‘Olyā; also known as Mahmanduz, Mehmāndār, and Mehmāndār-e Bālā) is a village in Gavdul-e Markazi Rural District, in the Central District of Malekan County, East Azerbaijan Province, Iran. At the 2006 census, its population was 108, in 27 families.

References 

Populated places in Malekan County